An annular solar eclipse will occur on Thursday, June 11, 2048 with a magnitude of 0.9441. A solar eclipse occurs when the Moon passes between Earth and the Sun, thereby totally or partly obscuring the image of the Sun for a viewer on Earth. An annular solar eclipse occurs when the Moon's apparent diameter is smaller than the Sun's, blocking most of the Sun's light and causing the Sun to look like an annulus (ring). An annular eclipse appears as a partial eclipse over a region of the Earth thousands of kilometres wide.

Images 
Animated path

Related eclipses

Solar eclipses of 2047–2050

Saros 128

Inex series 

In the 19th century:

 Solar Saros 120: Total Solar Eclipse of 1816 Nov 19

 Solar Saros 121: Hybrid Solar Eclipse of 1845 Oct 30

 Solar Saros 122: Annular Solar Eclipse of 1874 Oct 10

In the 22nd century:

 Solar Saros 130: Total Solar Eclipse of 2106 May 03

 Solar Saros 131: Annular Solar Eclipse of 2135 Apr 13

 Solar Saros 132: Hybrid Solar Eclipse of 2164 Mar 23

 Solar Saros 133: Total Solar Eclipse of 2193 Mar 03

Metonic cycle

References

External links 
 NASA graphics

2048 6 11
2048 in science
2048 6 11
2048 6 11